The 2019 Internationaux de Tennis de Vendée was a professional tennis tournament played on hard courts. It was the seventh edition of the tournament which was part of the 2019 ATP Challenger Tour. It took place in Mouilleron-le-Captif, France between 7 and 13 October 2019.

Singles main-draw entrants

Seeds

 1 Rankings are as of 30 September 2019.

Other entrants
The following players received wildcards into the singles main draw:
  Geoffrey Blancaneaux
  Hugo Grenier
  Tom Jomby
  Kamil Majchrzak
  Rayane Roumane

The following player received entry into the singles main draw as an alternate:
  Luca Vanni

Champions

Singles

 Mikael Ymer def.  Mathias Bourgue 6–1, 6–4.

Doubles

 Jonny O'Mara /  Ken Skupski def.  Sander Arends /  David Pel 6–1, 6–4.

References

2019 ATP Challenger Tour
2019
2019 in French sport
October 2019 sports events in France